Jerry Wallace is a former Irish hurler and former manager of the Antrim senior hurling team.

A native of Midleton, County Cork, Wallace came to be known as one of the most respected hurling trainers in recent times. He was the physical trainer with the Cork senior hurling team that won back-to-back All-Ireland titles in 2004 and 2005. He later served as trainer with both the Antrim and Limerick senior hurling teams.

He also has an impressive record at club level in Kerry with Ballyduff. He led them to back-to-back County Championships in 2010 and 2011, and also led them to the final of the Munster Intermediate Championship.

Wallace was ratified as manager of the Antrim senior hurling team on 10 October 2011.

Wallace was ratified as Director of Limerick Underage Academy of Hurling from 2012 - 2015 and also as a Hurling Coach and Selector to the Limerick Minor Hurling Team.
He coached them to back-to-back Munster Minor Hurling titles in 2013 and 2014.
Limerick lost the famous "Hawk-Eye" Minor Semi-final to Galway in 2013.
Limerick lost the All-Ireland Minor Hurling Final to Kilkenny in 2014.

Midleton GAA Club in Cork appointed Wallace to Manage and Coach their Senior Hurling Team from 2015 - 2017.
He completed that appointment with Midleton contesting the 2015 and 2016 County Hurling Semi-finals with Glen Rovers and Erin's Own.
He successfully guided them to win the REDfm Senior Hurling League in 2015.
 
Glynn-Barntown of Wexford appointed Wallace to manage their Senior Hurling Team for 2017.

In November 2017 Jerry Wallace returned to his former post as Director of Limerick's Underage Hurling Academy 

As Manager of Cork Minor Camogie in 2018 he guided them to their first ever All-Ireland Minor A Camogie Trophy with a 0-18 to 1-11 victory over Galway. He repeated the feat making it back to back minor titles in 2019 as Cork over came Clare.

References

Year of birth missing (living people)
Living people
Hurling managers
Cork hurlers
People from Midleton